Gerrit Badenhorst (born 10 October 1962) is a former WPC world champion powerlifter and professional strongman competitor from South Africa.

Powerlifting
Badenhorst was born on 10 October 1962 in De Aar, Northern Cape, South Africa. As a sportsman he played rugby union, but excelled in the sports of weightlifting and powerlifting.

Before Badenhorst competed for South Africa internationally on the strongman stage, he first represented his country as a powerlifter. Between 1988 and 1990, Badenhorst won three world titles in the World Powerlifting Congress organization. He also broke the world record in the total (squat+bench press+deadlift) of 1102.5 kg (2431 lb).

At first His world titles and world records led to him being acclaimed the greatest ever powerlifter at the time, with his totals having beaten the likes of Lars Noren, Don Reinhoudt and Bill Kazmaier. However Kazmaier, Noren and Rienhound had not utilized bench shirts when posting their totals. Lars Noren Posted his 1077.5 kg total in the 1987 IPF World Championship, which was drug tested. Having reached the pinnacle of the sport of powerlifting, a lack of financial incentive led him to strongman competitions.

Strongman
Badenhorst was eight times South Africa's Strongest Man. Badenhorst was also a seven time World's Strongest Man finalist, coming second at the 1995 World's Strongest Man and third at the 1996 World's Strongest Man contests.

In strength athletics Badenhorst had already made an impact in South Africa having been crowned South Africa's Strongest Man in 1989, 1990 and 1992. At the 1992 World's Strongest Man as a newcomer he placed fourth. In 1993 he won the highly regarded World Strongman Challenge and entered the 1993 World's Strongest Man contest as one of the favourites but had to retire due to an injury in the Pole Push.

At the 1994 World's Strongest Man he again came fourth. Determined to improve, and having won South Africa's Strongest Man once again, he entered the 1995 World's Strongest Man as one of the favourites. Despite an injury sustained in the Bavarian stone lift during the qualifying heats, he came second overall to Magnus Ver Magnusson in the finals. He competed in a further five World's Strongest Man contests, coming third in 1996, and 7th in 2000. Badenhorst won his heat at the 1998 World's Strongest Man and qualified for the final, but sustained an injury and was unable to compete.

Personal Records 

Done in official WPC Powerlifting meets.

 Squat – 450 kg (992.8 lb) double ply squat suit, with knee wraps. Former WPC World Record in 140 kg/308lb class 
 Bench Press – 250 kg (551.15 lb) double ply shirt
 Deadlift – 402.5 kg (887.4 lb) Raw, former WPC World Record in 308lb class
 Total – 1,105 kg (450/250/402.5) / 2,431 lb (992/551/887)
 Career aggregate total – 1,102.5 kg (450/250/402.5) / 2,475 lb (992/550/887)

Personal life

Honours
8 times South Africa's Strongest Man (1989, 1990, 1992–1995, 1998 and 2001)
4th place 1992 World's Strongest Man  
8th place (withdrew due to injury) 1993 World's Strongest Man  
4th place 1994 World's Strongest Man  
2nd place 1995 World's Strongest Man  
3rd place 1996 World's Strongest Man  
7th place 2000 World's Strongest Man  
DNP (qualified for finals, injured during heats) 1998 World's Strongest Man

References

External links
www.vikingpower.net profile

1962 births
Afrikaner people
Living people
South African strength athletes
South African people of German descent
South African people of Dutch descent
South African powerlifters